Keegan Oates (born 3 January 2000) is an Australian cricketer. In September 2018, he was named in the Hobart Hurricanes' squad for the 2018 Abu Dhabi T20 Trophy. He made his Twenty20 debut for the Hobart Hurricanes in the 2018 Abu Dhabi T20 Trophy on 6 October 2018.

References

External links
 

2000 births
Living people
Australian cricketers
Place of birth missing (living people)
Hobart Hurricanes cricketers